Max Jakobson (September 30, 1923  – March 9, 2013) was a Finnish diplomat and journalist of Finnish-Jewish descent. Jakobson was an instrumental figure in shaping Finland's policy of neutrality during the Cold War.

Max Jakobson was born in 1923 in Viipuri, Finland (now Vyborg, Russia), as son of Finnish-Jewish tailor Leo Jakobsson and his ethnic Finnish wife Helmi (née Virtanen). He began his career as a journalist. He worked at the BBC. From 1953 to 1974 he was employed by the Finnish Ministry for Foreign Affairs eventually acting as Finland's ambassador to the United Nations in 1965-1971 and Finland's Ambassador to Sweden in 1971−1974. Jakobson ran for United Nations Secretary-General in the 1971 selection. He was one of three candidates to receive the required 9 votes in the Security Council, but he was vetoed by the Soviet Union.

Jakobson was active as a commentator on Finnish politics, having written several books and numerous articles on Finnish political history and contemporary Finnish politics. He also acted as chairman of the Estonian International Commission for Investigation of Crimes Against Humanity investigating Communist and Nazi crimes in Estonia.

Works

 Englanti valinkauhassa (1952)
 Diplomaattien talvisota (1955)
 Kuumalla linjalla (1968)
 Paasikivi Tukholmassa (1978). .
 Veteen piirretty viiva (1980). .
 38. kerros (1983). .

 Vallanvaihto (1992). .
 Finland in the New Europe (1998)
 Väkivallan vuodet, 20. vuosisadan tilinpäätös (1999). .
 Pelon ja toivon aika, 20. vuosisadan tilinpäätös (2001). (.
 Tilinpäätös, 20. vuosisadan tilinpäätös (2003). .
 Tulevaisuus? (2005). .
 Kohtalonvuodet – Suomi nousi, taipui ja selvisi (2008). .

References

Sources 
 Tarkka, Jukka: Max Jakobson – kansainvälinen suomalainen ("Max Jacobson - International Finn"). Otava, 1983.  

1923 births
2013 deaths
Finnish journalists
Finnish Jews
Finnish politicians
20th-century Finnish historians
Diplomats  from Vyborg
Ambassadors of Finland to Sweden
Permanent Representatives of Finland to the United Nations
Recipients of the Order of the Cross of Terra Mariana, 1st Class